Philippe Gache (born 31 May 1962, Avignon, France) is a French race car driver.  He has raced in a number of disciplines, but for the last 20 years (as of 2006) has specialized in off-road racing. In 1992 he competed in the Indianapolis 500, but crashed his car. He has driven in the Dakar Rally in 2003–2006 and 7 times in the 24 Hours of Le Mans. In 2006 he took his best finish on the Dakar, 12th place overall. In the 2010 edition of the Dakar Rally, he drove an SMG Buggy.

Career Highlights
 1985 – French Formula Ford 1600 Champion
 1993 – Third FIA Touring Car Challenge
 1997 – Third FIA GT2 Championship
 2000 – Second French Carrera Cup Championship
 2001 – French Carrera Cup Champion

Racing record

Career summary

24 Hours of Le Mans results

Complete International Formula 3000 results
(key) (Races in bold indicate pole position; races in italics indicate fastest lap.)

American open-wheel racing
(key)

PPG Indy Car World Series

Indianapolis 500

Complete International Touring Car Championship results
(key)

Complete FIA GT Championship results
(key) (Races in bold indicate pole position) (Races in italics indicate fastest lap)

Dakar Rally results

WRC results

References

External links

1962 births
French racing drivers
Living people
Indianapolis 500 drivers
International Formula 3000 drivers
24 Hours of Le Mans drivers
Dakar Rally drivers
World Sportscar Championship drivers
Blancpain Endurance Series drivers
24 Hours of Spa drivers
Sports car racing team owners

Oreca drivers
Graff Racing drivers
DAMS drivers
FIA Motorsport Games drivers